R Corvi (R Crv) is a Mira variable star in the constellation Corvus, which ranges from a magnitude of 6.7 to 14.4 with a period of approximately 317 days. In the sky it appears close to Gamma Corvi and can be seen in the same binocular field. Extrapolating its luminosity from its period of 317 days yields a distance of 810 parsecs.

References

Mira variables
Corvus (constellation)
107199
Corvi, R
M-type giants
060106
Durchmusterung objects
Emission-line stars